Frederick John Thurston (21 September 1901 – 12 December 1953) was an English clarinettist.

Career
From the age of 7 he was taught by his father and he won an open scholarship to the Royal College of Music, becoming a pupil of Charles Draper.  During the 1920s he played with the orchestra of the Royal Opera House and the BBC Wireless Orchestra before becoming principal clarinettist of the newly formed BBC Symphony Orchestra. He left the BBC Symphony Orchestra in 1946 to concentrate on chamber music. He was principal clarinetist of the Philharmonia Orchestra and can be heard on the Toscanini recording of the Brahms Symphonies. Thurston can also be heard on Volume 1 of Historical Clarinet Recordings on the Victoria Soames Samek's Clarinet Classics CD Label.

He gave the first performances of many new works, including Arnold Bax's Clarinet Sonata, Arthur Bliss's Clarinet Quintet and Gerald Finzi's Clarinet Concerto, and a private performance of Roger Fiske's 1941 Clarinet Sonata.  Works dedicated to him include Malcolm Arnold's Clarinet Concerto No 1, Iain Hamilton's Three Nocturnes, Herbert Howells's Clarinet Sonata, John Ireland's Fantasy-Sonata, Gordon Jacob's Clarinet Quintet, Elizabeth Maconchy's Clarinet Concertino #1, Alan Rawsthorne's Clarinet Concerto and Freda Swain's Rhapsody.

He taught at the Royal College of Music from 1930 to 1953.  In 1953 he married Thea King (later Dame Thea King), one of his pupils, but died later the same year from lung cancer.

Writings

The Passage Studies Volume 1 ( Boosey & Hawkes )
The Passage Studies Volume 2 ( Boosey & Hawkes )
The Passage Studies Volume 3 ( Boosey & Hawkes )

References

Further reading

1901 births
1953 deaths
Academics of the Royal College of Music
Alumni of the Royal College of Music
British clarinetists
British classical clarinetists
Deaths from lung cancer
Place of death missing
20th-century classical musicians
20th-century British musicians